The Akron Racers were a women's softball team based in Akron, Ohio. They have moved to Cleveland and been renamed the Cleveland Comets in 2018. The team was started by Joey Arietta in 1999 to participate in the Women's Pro Softball League (WPSL).  From 2004-2017, they have played as a member of National Pro Fastpitch (NPF).

History 
The Akron Racers became the first Midwest franchise to begin play in the WPSL in 1999. The league suspended play in Orlando and assigned the Wahoos roster to the Racers.  In 2000, the league consolidated sending the Georgia Pride team to Akron. The team was renamed the Ohio Pride. Both teams began sharing Firestone Stadium 

In their first year the Racers made it to the championship of the WPSL, but lost to the Tampa Bay FireStix.

The WPSL suspended operations in 2001; the Racers was the only team of the four 2001 teams to revive when the league reformed as the NPF in 2004. In 2005 the Racers beat the Chicago Bandits to win the NPF championship.  From 2004 to 2008, the Akron Racers have compiled an all-time win–loss record of 149-94.

Crystl Bustos was named manager in October 2009, replacing Barb Sherwood.

The Racers upset the highly favored Chicago Bandits in the 2014 NPF Championship Series in Hoover, AL in the best two-of-three to move on to face the USSSA Pride.
The Racers and Pride battle for eighth innings before the Pride pushed across a run on the bottom of the eighth inning to take the 1-0 advantage. The Racers could not hold off the Pride in game two dropping the 8-3 decision.

The Racers grabbed Coach of the Year honors (Brian Levin & Dustin Combs), Offensive Player of the Year (Nerissa Myers) and Jennie Finch Award (Kelley Montalvo).
Five Racers were named to the All-NPF Team including Myers, Montalvo, Rachele Fico and rookies Jill Barrett and Ashley Thomas.

2015

Of their selections in the 2015 NPF Draft, the Racers signed Griffin Joiner of Kentucky, Shellie Robinson of USC Upstate, and Megan Low of UTSA.

2016

Rawlings awarded their first Gold Glove to a female in 2016, and the Racers' AJ Andrews was the initial recipient.

15th Anniversary Impact Honorees
To celebrate their 15th anniversary, a milestone marking them as one of the longest-running pro female sports franchises, the Racers announced the would be naming 30 members of a Racers' "Impact" team.  These 30 players are an all-star collection of players throughout the Racers' 15 years, chosen by a panel evaluating those who had the most impact on the team.

The Impact honorees were made public one at a time on the Racers' website.  Following is the full List of 2016 Akron Racers IMPACT Honorees

2017
Citing a desire to focus on his position as coach of the Belmont Bruins softball team, Brian Levin stepped down as the Racers' head coach.  The Racers' record was 4-5 on June 16.

The Racers finished the regular season in third place, and were swept by the Scrap Yard Dawgs in the first round of the playoffs.

General managers
 Joey Arrietta (-present)

All-time head coaches

Season-by-season 

|-
|1999 || 34|| 32 || 0 ||2nd place WPSL || Lost to Virginia Roadsters in WPSL Semifinals
|-
|2000 || 15 || 17 || 0 ||3rd place WPSL || Did Not Qualify
|-
|2004 || 39 || 21 || 0 ||2nd place National Pro Fastpitch || Lost to NY/NJ Juggernaut in NPF Semifinals
|-
|2005 || 36 || 10 || 0 ||2nd place National Pro Fastpitch || Won NPF Championship
|-
|2006 || 29 || 17 || 0 ||3rd place National Pro Fastpitch || Lost to Connecticut Brakettes in NPF Semifinals
|-
|2007 || 26 || 17 || 0 ||2nd place National Pro Fastpitch || Eliminated by Rockford Thunder in Game 3
|-
|2008 || 19 || 29 || 0 ||5th place National Pro Fastpitch || Did Not Qualify
|-
|2009 || 26 || 14 || 0 ||2nd place National Pro Fastpitch || Lost to Rockford Thunder in NPF Semifinals
|-
|2010 || 24 || 25 || 0 ||3rd place National Pro Fastpitch || Lost to USSSA Pride in NPF Semifinals
|-
|2011 || 22 || 17 || 0 ||2nd place National Pro Fastpitch || Lost to Chicago Bandits in NPF Semifinals
|-
|2012 || 14 || 30 || 0 ||4th place National Pro Fastpitch|| Lost to USSSA Pride in NPF Semifinals
|-
|2013 || 16 || 32 || 0 ||3rd place National Pro Fastpitch || Lost to USSSA Pride in Game 2 of NPF Championship Semifinals
|-
|2014 || 24 || 24 || 0 ||3rd place National Pro Fastpitch|| Lost to USSSA Pride in NPF Finals
|-
|2015 || 22 || 26 || 0 ||3rd place National Pro Fastpitch|| Lost to Chicago Bandits in NPF Semifinals
|-
|2016 || 22 || 28 || 0 ||4th place National Pro Fastpitch|| Lost to USSSA Pride in NPF Semifinals
|-
|2017 || 26 || 24 || 0 ||3rd place National Pro Fastpitch|| Lost to Scrap Yard Dawgs in NPF Semifinals
|-
! WPSL Totals || 49|| 49|| 0
|colspan="2"|
|-
! WPSL and NPF Totals || 394 || 363|| 0
|colspan="2"|
|-
! NPF Totals || 345|| 314 || 0
|colspan="2"|

Notable players 
 Crystl Bustos (1999, 2005, 2006)

Retired numbers
The Racers have retired four numbers:

Current players

References

External links 
 Akron Racers
 

  
 

 
Softball teams
National Pro Fastpitch teams
Sports in Akron, Ohio
Sports clubs established in 1999
1999 establishments in Ohio